Sondermann is a cartoon character of the painter and cartoonist Bernd Pfarr, which appeared, until August 1994, in a column of the same name by the writer Simone Borowiak and, from 1987 to August 2004, regularly in the satirical magazine Titanic. Model for the name was Gerhard Sondermann, the first publisher of Titanic.

Sondermann is a creation of an illustrator, who, as Bernd Pfarr himself once said, wants "to drive reality out of the pictures".

The comic
The world of Sondermann is subject to its own, individual laws: "Negro scrubbing" (German: "Negerschrubben") is a traditional ritual in Sondermann's company, Sondermann and his chef subdue their hunger by "huddling softly together" (German: "sich weich aneinander schmiegen"), consuming a Schnitzel or taking out the trash are common yoga exercises, and Sondermann defeats God (German: "den lieben Gott") in Tennis.

Sondermann's world is populated by strange creatures:
 a neighbor, Schulze, who often "comes to detonate" (German: "zum Sprengen kommt");
 God, as mentioned above;
 the blowdryer-armed super hero Supererpel, who is not actually that heroic;
 the brothers Strittmatter, also neighbors of Sondermann, who are penguins and "detonate saurians in their spare time" (German: "in ihrer Freizeit Saurier sprengen");
 the by Sondermann for inexplicable reasons unbeloved Mr. Sharp, "lord over seven flies" (German: "Herr über sieben Fliegen"), also a penguin and "newest stallion" (German: "neuester Stecher") of Sondermann's mother;
 Herr Detlev Siehlbeck, who always carries a dead fish with him and expects that one pets it;
 the small dog Willi, whose "freethinking remarks about the preparation of his food" (German: "freigeistige Ausführungen der Zubereitung seines Fresschens betreffend") impress the Weltgeist so much that they cause metaphysical levitation in it;
 and not least Sondermann himself: accountant, single and eager to learn, with a pronounced artistic side, while not insusceptible for erotic or homoerotic attractions.

Early Sondermann episodes mostly limited themselves on the master-servant-relationship between Sondermann and his chef. Out of this basic conflict, grew only over time the pandemonium of the above listed characters. According to writer Robert Gernhardt, the character very quickly developed a "life of its own" (German: "Eigenleben"), for which even the editorial staff of Titanic was not prepared.

Sondermann Award
Since 2004 Bernd Pfarr's character name also denotes an audience prize for comics awarded by and at the Frankfurt Book Fair in collaboration with the magazine Comixene, the Frankfurter Rundschau, and Spiegel Online. Some of the prizes include a cash sum.

Recipients 2004
International comic: Asterix and the Class Act by Albert Uderzo and René Goscinny
Domestic comic: Nichtlustig 2 by Joscha Sauer
International manga/manhwa: Angel Sanctuary by Kaori Yuki
Domestic manga: Without Identity by Sascha Schätzchen
Newcomer 2004: Joscha Sauer (Nichtlustig 2)

Recipients 2005
International comic: Onkel Dagobert by Don Rosa
Domestic comic: Die Chronik der Unsterblichen by Wolfgang Hohlbein, Benjamin von Eckartsberg and Thomas von Kummant
International manga/manhwa: One Piece by Eiichiro Oda
Domestic manga: Dystopia by Judith Park
Cartoon: Shit happens! by Ralph Ruthe
Newcomer 2005: Arne Bellstorf (Acht, neun, zehn)
Bernd-Pfarr-special-prize for comical art: Rudi Hurzlmeier

Recipients 2006
International comic: Sin City by Frank Miller
Domestic comic: Adolf – der Bonker by Walter Moers
International manga/manhwa: Shinshi Doumei Cross by Arina Tanemura
Domestic manga: Jibun-Jishin by Nina Werner
Cartoon: Shit happens! by Ralph Ruthe
Newcomer 2006: Moki (Asleep in a foreign place)
Bernd-Pfarr-special-prize for comical art: Greser & Lenz

Recipients 2007
International comic: Calvin & Hobbes by Bill Watterson
Domestic comic: Cash – I see a darkness by Reinhard Kleist
International manga/manhwa: Death Note by Takeshi Obata and Tsugumi Ōba
Domestic manga: Gothic Sports by Anike Hage
Cartoon: Shit happens! by Ralph Ruthe
Newcomer 2007: Dirk Schwieger
Bernd-Pfarr-special-prize for comical art: Rattelschneck (Stulli, das Pausenbrot)

Recipients 2008
International comic: Prinz Eisenherz by Hal Foster
Domestic comic: Die Sache mit Sorge by Isabel Kreitz
International manga/manhwa: Volume 44 of One Piece by Eiichiro Oda
Domestic manga: Stupid Story 1 by Anna Hollmann
Cartoon: Shit happens! by Ralph Ruthe
Newcomer 2008: Barbara Yelin
Bernd-Pfarr-special-prize for comical art: Stephan Rürup

Recipients 2009
International comic: Der Dunkle Turm by Jae Lee et al. (illustration), Peter David and Robin Furth (text), based on The Dark Tower by Stephen King
Domestic comic: Prototyp by Ralf König
International manga/manhwa:  Volume 48 of One Piece by Eiichiro Oda
Domestic manga: Stupid Story 2 by Anna Hollmann
Cartoon: Nichtlustig 4 by Joscha Sauer
Newcomer 2009: Michael Meier
Bernd-Pfarr-special-prize for comical art: Kamagurka

Recipients 2010
 Comic: Asterix and Obelix's Birthday by René Goscinny and Albert Uderzo, Egmont Ehapa
 Manga/Manhwa: Legend of Zelda 1 by Akira Himekawa, Tokyopop
 Cartoon: Das schwarze Buch by Uli Stein, Lappan
 Webcomic (endowed with 1,000 Euro): Beetlebum by Johannes Kretzschmar.
 Newcomer 2010: Felix Mertikat and Benjamin Schreuder (Jakob)
 Bernd-Pfarr-special-prize for comical art: Ari Plikat

Recipients 2011 
 Comic international: Das Leben von Anne Frank von Ernie Colón (drawings) and Sid Jacobson (text), Carlsen
 Domestic comic (national): Haarmann von Isabel Kreitz (drawings) and Peer Meter (text), Carlsen
 Manga international: Fairy Tail, 4th part, by Hiro Mashima, Carlsen
 Domestic manga (national): Die Wolke by Anike Hage, after Die Wolke von Gudrun Pausewang, Tokyopop
 Webcomic (endowed with 1,000 Euro): Entoman von David Füleki
 Newcomer 2011: Asja Wiegand
 Bernd-Pfarr-special-prize for comical art: Eugen Egner

Recipients 2012 
 Comic international: Habibi von Craig Thompson, Reprodukt
 Domestic comic (national): Steam Noir von Felix Mertikat (drawings) und Benjamin Schreuder (text), Cross Cult
 Manga international: Pretty Guardian Sailor Moon von Naoko Takeuchi, EMA
 Domestic manga (national): Stupid Story 3 von Anna Hollmann, Tokyopop
 Webcomic (endowed with 1,000 Euro): Das Leben ist kein Ponyhof von Sarah Burrini
 Newcomer 2012: Aisha Franz
 Bernd-Pfarr-special-prize for comical art: Christoph Niemann

Recipients 2013 
 Bernd-Pfarr-special-prize for comical art: Hilke Raddatz
 Sponsorship award: Katharina Greve

Recipients 2014 
 Bernd-Pfarr-special-prize for comical art: Ernst Kahl
 Sponsorship award: Sebastian Lörscher
 Scholarship: Leonard Riegel

Recipients 2015 
 Bernd-Pfarr-special-prize for comical art: Michael Sowa
 Sponsorship award: Leonard Riegel
 Scholarship: Ella Carina Werner

Recipients 2016 
 Bernd-Pfarr-special-prize for comical art: Thomas Kapielski
 Sponsorship award: Jan Böhmermann
 Scholarship: Fabian Lichter

Recipients 2017 
 Sondermann-Preis für Komische Kunst: Hans Traxler
 Sponsorship award: Kathrin Fricke
 Scholarship: Daniel Sibbe

Recipients 2018 
 Sondermann-Preis für Komische Kunst: Otto Waalkes for life work
 Sponsorship award: Anna Haifisch
 Scholarship: Paula Irmschler

Recipients 2019 
 Sondermann-Preis für Komische Kunst: Nicolas Mahler for his comics based on masterpieces of world literature
 Sponsorship award: Stefanie Sargnagel
 Scholarship: Adrian Schulz

References

German comic strips
German comics characters
Fictional German people
German comics titles
1987 comics debuts
Comics characters introduced in 1987
2004 comics endings
Satirical comics
Comics awards
Fiction about God